The 29th Saskatchewan Legislature was elected at the 2020 Saskatchewan general election.

Notably, this is the first Saskatchewan Legislature in which some government members will sit on the Speaker's left. The Saskatchewan Legislature chamber is among the most spacious of all Westminster parliaments relative to its number of members, meaning that the entire government caucus is usually able to sit on the Speaker's right regardless of the size of its majority. However, due to the COVID-19 pandemic, desks have been spaced out as much as possible to satisfy physical distancing requirements, an arrangement which made it necessary to place a relatively equal number of desks on both sides of the aisle.

Members

Member in bold italic is the Premier of Saskatchewan.
Members in bold are in the Cabinet of Saskatchewan.
Members in italic are Leaders of the respective parties.
Member with † denotes the Speaker of the Assembly.

References 

Terms of the Saskatchewan Legislature
2020 establishments in Saskatchewan
2020 in Saskatchewan
2020 in Canadian politics